The Second Epistle to Timothy is one of the three pastoral epistles traditionally attributed to Paul the Apostle. Addressed to Timothy, a fellow missionary, it is traditionally considered to be the last epistle he wrote before his death.

Although the pastorals are written under Paul's name, they are different from his other epistles, and since the early 19th century, scholars have increasingly seen them as the work of an unknown student of Paul's doctrine. They do not address Paul's common themes, such as the believers' unity with Christ, and they reflect a church hierarchy that is more organized and defined than the church was in Paul's time.

Nonetheless, a number of major scholars have defended the traditional authorship of 2 Timothy.

Authorship

Some modern critical scholars argue that 2 Timothy, as well as the other two so-called 'pastoral letters' (1 Timothy and Titus), were not written by Paul but by an anonymous author, sometime between 90 and 140 AD. Some scholars refer to the assumedly pseudonymous author as "the Pastor".

The language and ideas of 2 Timothy are notably different from the other two pastoral epistles yet similar to the later Pauline epistles, especially the ones he wrote in captivity. This has led some scholars to conclude that the author of 2 Timothy is a different person from that of 1 Timothy and Titus. Raymond E. Brown proposed that this letter was written by a follower of Paul who had knowledge of Paul's last days.

Most scholars, both those arguing for and against its authenticity, are of the opinion that 2 Timothy belongs to a pseudepigraphic genre known as the testamentary genre or farewell discourse, the 'testament' genre contains two main elements: ethical warnings to be followed after the death of the writer and revelations of the future. The significant fact about the 'testament' genre was not in its markers but in its nature; it is argued that a piece of 'testament' literature is meant to "be a completely transparent fiction".

Jerome Murphy-O'Connor, however, argued that 2 Timothy was written by Paul and that the other two pastoral epistles were written by someone else using it as a model.

Content
According to the letter, Paul urges Timothy not to have a "spirit of timidity" and not to "be ashamed to testify about our Lord" (1:7–8). He also entreats Timothy to come to him before winter, and to bring Mark with him (cf. Philippians 2:22). He was anticipating that "the time of his departure was at hand" (4:6), and he exhorts his "son Timothy" to all diligence and steadfastness in the face of false teachings, with advice about combating them with reference to the teachings of the past, and to patience under persecution (1:6–15), and to a faithful discharge of all the duties of his office (4:1–5), with all the solemnity of one who was about to appear before the Judge of the quick and the dead.

Paul clearly anticipates his being put to death and realities beyond in his valedictory found in 2 Timothy 4:6–8: "For I am now ready to be offered, and the time of my departure is at hand. I have fought a good fight, I have finished my course, I have kept the faith: Henceforth there is laid up for me a crown of righteousness, which the Lord, the righteous judge, shall give me at that day: and not to me only, but unto all them also that love his appearing."

2 Timothy contains one of Paul's Christological Hymns in 2:11–13:

or

Portions of 2 Timothy parallel the Epistle to the Philippians, also believed to be written (with Timothy's help) near the time of Paul's death.

Based on the traditional view that 2 Timothy was Paul's final epistle, chapter 4 talks (v. 10) about how Demas, formerly considered a "fellow worker", had deserted him for Thessalonica, "having loved this present world". In sharp contrast to his dispute with Barnabas over Mark (Acts 15:37–40), which resulted in the two parting ways, Paul now considered Mark to be "profitable to the ministry" (v. 11). The chapter also features the only biblical mention of Linus (v. 21), who in Catholic tradition is listed as Peter's immediate successor as Bishop of Rome.

In the epistle, Paul asks Timothy to bring his coat and books to him next time he sees him.

See also
 Biblical inspiration
 Epistle to Titus
 First Epistle to Timothy
 Itching ears
 Textual variants in the Second Epistle to Timothy

Notes

References

External links

 Second Timothy by E.H. Wendland
 EarlyChristianWritings.com discussion of 2 Timothy
 EarlyChristianWritings.com further discussion of the Pastorals (on the 1 Timothy page)
  Various versions

 
2nd-century Christian texts
Timothy 2
Timothy 2
Timothy2